Hamsavahini Vidyalaya is a Day school run by Hamsavahini Educational Society in Vakalapudi, Kakinada in Andhra Pradesh, India.

The School is housed in a three-storeyed building with a plinth area of 60,000 sq.ft. It has all modern infrastructural facilities. 

The emblem of the school "Hamsavahini", means Goddess Saraswathi, instils in the minds of tender boys and girls such noble ideas and ideals as unswerving devotion to learning, knowledge and wisdom.

The school has the distinction of making its mark as one of the best schools in the district and was so recognised by the authorities and awarded certificates of appreciation on a number of occasions for continuous achievement of excellent results.

External links
http://www.hamsavahinividyalaya.org/
https://www.facebook.com/Hamsavahini-Vidyalaya-106580869392983/

Schools affiliated to CBSE
Schools in East Godavari district
Education in Kakinada
Educational institutions established in 1991
1991 establishments in Andhra Pradesh